Trygve Andersen (born 10 July 1934) is a retired Norwegian football player. He played as a midfielder, and represented the Norway national team on 27 occasions between 1957 and 1965, scoring one goal.

Career statistics

Honours
Brann
1. divisjon: 1961–62, 1963

References

Norwegian footballers
SK Brann players
Living people
1934 births
People from Askøy
Association football midfielders
Norway international footballers
Sportspeople from Vestland